Malapterurus barbatus is a species of electric catfish native to Guinea, Sierra Leone and Liberia. This species grows to a length of  SL.

References

Malapteruridae
Fish of West Africa
Taxa named by Steven Mark Norris
Fish described in 2002
Strongly electric fish